Posyolok sovkhoza Razdolye is a rural locality (a settlement) in Gubaryovskoye Rural Settlement, Semiluksky District, Voronezh Oblast, Russia. The population was 436 as of 2010. There are 12 streets.

Geography 
The settlement is located 10 km north of Semiluki (the district's administrative centre) by road. Bogoyavlenovka is the nearest rural locality.

References 

Rural localities in Semiluksky District